Fury & Flames is the fourth studio album by the band Hate Eternal and their debut album on Metal Blade Records worldwide and EMI Records in South America. The album features the addition of new members Shaune Kelley as second guitarist and Jade Simonetto on drums, while bass guitarist Alex Webster (Cannibal Corpse, Blotted Science) returns to replace Randy Piro. Cover art by Paul Romano (Mastodon, Animosity, The Red Chord). The album has had a lot of praise for the album's heaviness and emotion. Erik Rutan, the band's frontman, says he put a lot of emotion into the album because of the death of his friend Jared Anderson who played bass for the band.

This was the first time since Ripping Corpse's Dreaming with the Dead album that Shaune Kelley and Erik Rutan played guitar on the same album.

Track listing
 "Hell Envenom" - 4:09
 "Whom Gods May Destroy" - 3:42
 "Para Bellum" - 4:30
 "Bringer of Storms" - 5:18
 "The Funerary March" - 4:15
 "Thus Salvation" - 3:58
 "Proclamation of the Damned" - 4:14
 "Fury Within" - 3:34
 "Tombeau (Le Tombeau de la Fureur et Des Flammes)" - 4:42
 "Coronach" - 1:40

South American version bonus track:
11. Inside (02:40)

All Songs Written By Erik Rutan, except tracks 1 & 3 (Erik Rutan/Shaune Kelley).

Personnel
Hate Eternal
 Erik Rutan - lead guitar, vocals
 Alex Webster - bass
 Shaune Kelley - rhythm guitar
 Jade Simonetto - drums

Production
Erik Rutan - production, mixing, engineering
Shawn Ohtani - engineering
Alan Douches - mastering

Artwork
Alex McKnight - photography
Paul Romano - artwork

References

2008 albums
Hate Eternal albums
Metal Blade Records albums
Albums produced by Erik Rutan